Tomás Carbonell and Francisco Roig were the defending champions but were defeated in the quarterfinals by Pablo Albano and Lucas Arnold.

Andrew Kratzmann and Jack Waite won in the final 6–7, 6–3, 6–4 against Albano and Arnold.

Seeds
Champion seeds are indicated in bold text while text in italics indicates the round in which those seeds were eliminated.

  Luis Lobo /  Javier Sánchez (quarterfinals)
  Tomás Carbonell /  Francisco Roig (quarterfinals)
  Donald Johnson /  Francisco Montana (first round)
  Hendrik Jan Davids /  Stephen Noteboom (first round)

Draw

External links
 1996 Marbella Open Doubles draw

Doubles